Ernst Zaugg (5 April 1934 – 10 December 2016) was a Swiss sprinter who specialized in the 400 metres. He was born in Bern. He finished sixth in the 4 × 400 metres relay at the 1960 Olympic Games with the team René Weber, Hansruedi Bruder and Christian Wägli. His personal best time was 46.6 seconds (1961).

References

1934 births
2016 deaths
Swiss male sprinters
Athletes (track and field) at the 1960 Summer Olympics
Olympic athletes of Switzerland
Sportspeople from Bern